Rebel Rabbit is a 1949 Warner Bros. Merrie Melodies animated short. The cartoon was released on April 9, 1949, and features Bugs Bunny.

Plot
Bugs notices high bounties on various animals. $50 (about $ today) on foxes, $75 (about $ today) on bears, but then he becomes offended by the two-cent bounty (about $ today) on rabbits. Bugs has himself mailed to Washington, D.C., where a supercilious game commissioner explains that the bounty is so low because, while foxes and bears are "obnoxious" animals who damage property, "rabbits are perfectly harmless." Bugs vows to prove that "A rabbit can be more obnoxious than anybody!" and after squirting the official's face with an ink pen, storms out, slamming the game commissioner's door so hard that the glass shatters.

Bugs begins his campaign of direct action by attacking a guard on the leg with his own billy club. From there, he pulls stunts like renaming Barney Baruch's private bench to "Bugs Bunny"bench, painting barbershop pole stripes on the Washington Monument, and rewiring the lights in Times Square to read "BUGS BUNNY WUZ HERE".

Various newspapers comment about Bugs' actions as he goes to Buffalo, New York and shuts down Niagara Falls (revealing a faucet above and some barrels beneath it). Bugs then sells the entire island of Manhattan back to the Native Americans and is shown walking through it wearing a stereotypical feathered headdress and smoking a peace pipe, asiding to the audience that "they wouldn't take it back unless I threw in a set of dishes". Afterwards, Bugs saws Florida off from the rest of the country and quotes "South America, take it away!" Bugs then wonders what other kind of devilry he can commit. Bugs heads to Panama and swipes all the locks off the Panama Canal, which are represented as actual locks as he yells "I got 'em! I got 'em!". Bugs then heads to Arizona where he fills up the Grand Canyon. He then concludes his campaign by literally tying up railroad tracks.

An outraged bombastic Southern Senator Claghorn–esque Congressman speaks before the United States Congress and demands that they take action against Bugs, but is interrupted by Bugs who emerges from the congressman's hat, slaps him and gives him a mocking kiss. The cartoon then shows live-action footage of the entire War Department mobilizing against him. Tanks come rumbling out of their garages, soldiers pour out of barracks, the US Horse Cavalry, tanks and jet planes charge toward Bugs  and bugles blow as the news of this is shown.

Bugs, now satisfied with the $1 million bounty on his head (about $ today, although the bounty is for him specifically, not rabbits in general), has his Tarzan yell interrupted by the whole US Army coming after him, much to his horror. Bugs then dives into a fox hole as artillery shells surround the foxhole. Bugs then says "Could it be that I carried this thing too far?" just as the shells explode. It then cuts to Alcatraz Island where Bugs, in his jail cell, finally remarks "Ehhh, could be...!"

Home media
The uncut short is available on the Looney Tunes Golden Collection: Volume 3 DVD set.

See also
 List of Bugs Bunny cartoons
"Florida Man", an internet meme often referencing the sequence of Bugs literally removing Florida as a joking solution to its insanity.

References

External links

 

1949 films
1949 short films
1949 animated films
Merrie Melodies short films
Films directed by Robert McKimson
Films set in California
Films set in Florida
Animated films set in New York City
Films set in Panama
Animated films set in San Francisco
Films set in the San Francisco Bay Area
Films set in Washington, D.C.
Films scored by Carl Stalling
Bugs Bunny films
1940s Warner Bros. animated short films
1940s English-language films